Arenaria ciliata, the fringed sandwort, is a perennial herb of the family Caryophyllaceae. A. ciliata is a calcicole occurring in open grassland and on bare rock in mountainous areas.

Distribution
It is European with an outlying population in Greenland. This species is not known from Britain. It was discovered in Ireland in 1806 growing on Ben Bulben Co. Sligo. This remains the only known Irish population.

References

Preston, C.D. Pearman, D. & Dines, T., (2002). New Atlas of The British and Irish Flora. Oxford.

ciliata
Flora of Greenland
Flora of Europe
Flora of Ireland
Plants described in 1753
Taxa named by Carl Linnaeus